Henry, Duke of Mecklenburg-Stargard (before 1412 – 26 May/20 August 1466) was the ruling Duke of Mecklenburg-Stargard, including the Lordships of Neubrandenburg, Stargard, Strelitz and Wesenberg, from 1417 to 1466.  He is sometimes called "Henry the Elder" to distinguish him from Duke Henry IV of Mecklenburg.

Life 
Henry was born before 1412 as the youngest child of Duke Ulrich I of Mecklenburg-Stargard and his wife Margaret.  He ruled Neubrandenburg, initially under guardianship.  In 1436 he and his cousin Duke John III of Mecklenburg-Stargard and Henry IV, Duke of Mecklenburg, inherited the Lordship of Werle.  After John III's death, Henry ruled all of Mecklenburg-Stargard.

Henry was considered a warlike ruler.  Thomas Kantzow called him "a wicked robber, who always bothers the Mark (i.e. Brandenburg) and the entire country all the way to Stettin, who was mad at all the cows, leaving Duke Joachim of Stettin wondering where he stored all the hides".  During Henry's reign, the Peace of Wittstock was concluded, which permanently fixed the southeastern boundary of Mecklenburg.

Marriage and issue 
Henry married three times:
 Jutta (d. 1427), the daughter of Lord Nicholas V of Werle-Waren
 Ingeborg, a daughter of Duke Bogislaw VIII of Pomerania
 Margaret (1442-1512), the daughter of Duke Frederick II, Duke of Brunswick-Lüneburg, whom he married in 1452

Issue 
 Ulrich II, Duke of Mecklenburg-Stargard
 Margaret (died: before 1451)
 Magdalene (died: 2 April 1532), married:
 Duke Wartislaw X of Pomerania
 Count Burchard V of Barby-Mühlingen
 Anne, a nun in Ribnitz Abbey (died: 7 January 1498)

Footnotes

External links 

 Genealogical table of the House of Mecklenburg

House of Mecklenburg
Dukes of Mecklenburg-Stargard
15th-century births
Year of birth uncertain
1466 deaths
15th-century German people